Naji Mubarak (born 27 March 1964) is a Kuwaiti hurdler. He competed in the men's 110 metres hurdles at the 1984 Summer Olympics.

References

1964 births
Living people
Athletes (track and field) at the 1984 Summer Olympics
Kuwaiti male hurdlers
Olympic athletes of Kuwait
Place of birth missing (living people)